Jiao Bingzhen, active 1689–1726) was a native of Jining, Shandong who became a noted painter and astronomer. He is one of the first Qing dynasty painters to blend traditional Chinese painting with western culture. He is also among the more significant portrait and miniature painters in the early Qing. He was skilled in painting people, landscapes, and buildings.

The Western influence in his art came from his exposure to the Jesuits at the Directorate of Astronomy. Their influence also exposed him to new ideas on astronomy and religion. At some point Jiao became a Roman Catholic and played a role on the Jesuit side of the Chinese Rites controversy.

Paintings

Notes

References
 Ci hai bian ji wei yuan hui. Ci hai. Shanghai: Shanghai ci shu chu ban she, 1979.

External links
China Page 1-6
"Illustrated Guide of Tilling and Weaving: Rural Life in China" by Jiao Bingzhen, March 1696

Qing dynasty painters
18th-century Chinese astronomers
Chinese Roman Catholics
Converts to Roman Catholicism
People from Jining
Painters from Shandong
Scientists from Shandong